The Men's 69 kg event at the 2010 South American Games was held over March 27 at 16:00.

Medalists

Results

References
Final

69kg M